Jeff Abbott (born 1963) is a U.S. suspense novelist. He has degrees in History and English from Rice University. He lives in Austin, Texas. Before writing full-time, he was a creative director at an advertising agency. His early novels were traditional detective fiction, but in recent years he has turned to writing thriller fiction. A theme of his work is the idea of ordinary people caught up in extraordinary danger and fighting to return to their normal lives. His novels are published in several countries and have also been bestsellers in the United Kingdom, Australia, Ireland, Germany, France and Portugal.  He is also Creative Director at Springbox, a Prophet company.

Bibliography

The Jordan Poteet mysteries 
These novels are more traditional mysteries, centering on Poteet's eccentric family in a small Texas town.

 Do Unto Others (Oct 1994) winner of the Agatha Award (given by Malice Domestic) and the Macavity Award (given by Mystery Readers International) for Best First Novel, nominated for the Dilys Award given by the Independent Mystery Booksellers Associations.
The Only Good Yankee (Apr 1995)–nominated for the Writers' League of Texas Violet Crown Award
Promises of Home (Jan 1996)
Distant Blood (Sep 1996)

The Whit Mosley series 
Mosley is a Texas judge and coroner who partners with investigator Claudia Salazar in a Gulf Coast county. These books are darker and more thriller-oriented than the Poteet novels.

A Kiss Gone Bad (Oct 2001)–nominated for the Anthony Award at Bouchercon XXXIII in the "Best paperback original" category.
Black Jack Point (Sep 2002)—nominated for the Edgar Award (given by Mystery Writers of America),; the Anthony Award for "Best paperback original"; and also for the Barry Award.
Cut and Run (Nov 2003)—nominated for the Edgar Award),

The Sam Capra Series 
Capra is a brilliant CIA agent who is set up and loses everything that matters to him. He then uses his skills to help the helpless, protect the innocent and track down those who took his family from him.

Stand-alone Novels 

Panic (Aug 2005)—nominated for the Thriller Award (given by the International Thriller Writers). Panic, has been optioned for film by The Weinstein Company and is in development.
 Fear (Aug 2006)
 Collision (Jul 2008)—known as Run in the United Kingdom Collision, has been optioned for film by Twentieth Century Fox.
 Trust Me (Jul 2009)
Blame (Jul 2017)
The Three Beths (October 2018)
Never Ask Me (July 2020)
An Ambush of Widows (July 2021)

Anthologies and Collections

References

External links 

 
 Jeff Abbott's Blog at http://blog.jeffabbott.com

1963 births
Living people
Rice University alumni
American mystery novelists
American thriller writers
Agatha Award winners
Macavity Award winners
American male novelists
20th-century American novelists
20th-century American male writers
21st-century American novelists
21st-century American male writers